Al Parker (1952–1992) was an American actor, director, and producer in gay pornographic films.

Al Parker may also refer to:

Al Parker (artist) (1906–1985), American artist and illustrator
Al Parker (tennis) (born 1968), American tennis player

See also
Albert Parker (disambiguation)
Alan Parker (disambiguation)
Alexander Parker (disambiguation)